Jim Cowell (born October 18, 1953) is a Canadian former professional ice hockey player. He was selected by the Vancouver Canucks in the sixth round (83rd overall) of the 1973 NHL Amateur Draft, and was also drafted by the Los Angeles Sharks in the 4th round (47th overall) of the 1973 WHA Amateur Draft.

Cowell played major junior hockey with the Ottawa 67's of the Ontario Hockey League. In the summer of 1973 he was selected in both the NHL and WHA drafts, however he broke his ankle while attending the Vancouver Canucks training camp forcing him to miss the start of the 1973-74 season. Cowell never played in the major leagues, but he did go on to play 14 seasons of professional hockey in the minor leagues.

References

External links

1953 births
Living people
Canadian ice hockey forwards
Des Moines Capitols players
Erie Blades players
Erie Golden Blades players
Fort Wayne Komets players
Los Angeles Sharks draft picks
Medicine Hat Tigers players
Ottawa 67's players
Philadelphia Firebirds (AHL) players
Rochester Americans players
Seattle Totems (WHL) players
Syracuse Blazers players
Vancouver Canucks draft picks
Sportspeople from Newmarket, Ontario
Ice hockey people from Ontario